Love Up the Pole is a 1936 British comedy film directed by Clifford Gulliver and starring Ernie Lotinga, Vivienne Chatterton and Wallace Lupino. It was made at the Cricklewood Studios in London, and distributed by Butcher's Film Service which specialised in low-budget British films.

Main cast
 Ernie Lotinga as Jimmy Josser  
 Vivienne Chatterton as Mrs. Berwick 
 Wallace Lupino as Major Toulonge  
 Jack Frost as Spud Walker  
 Davina Craig as Annie Noakes  
 Lorna Hubbard as Joan  
 Harold Wilkinson as Ramolini  
 Fred Schwartz as Mosenstein  
 Phyllis Dixey as Patient  
 John Kevan as Jack

References

Bibliography
 Low, Rachael. Filmmaking in 1930s Britain. George Allen & Unwin, 1985.
 Wood, Linda. British Films, 1927-1939. British Film Institute, 1986.

External links

1936 films
British comedy films
British black-and-white films
1936 comedy films
Films shot at Cricklewood Studios
1930s English-language films
1930s British films